Buchsbaum is a German surname meaning box tree. Notable people with the surname include:

 David Buchsbaum (1929–2021), American mathematician
 Otto Buchsbaum (1920–2000), Austrian-born Brazilian writer and ecological activist
 Ralph Buchsbaum (1907–2002), American biologist and author
 Monte Buchsbaum (born 1940), American neuroscientist and pioneer of functional neuroimaging
 Solomon J. Buchsbaum (1930-1993), American physicist and Presidential adviser

See also 
 Buxbaum
 Bucksbaum